Ante Jurić (17 May 1922 – 20 March 2012) was a Croatian Prelate of the Catholic Church.

Ante Jurić was born in Vranjic, now Croatia, and was ordained a priest on 18 May 1947. He was appointed the Archbishop of Split-Makarska on 10 September 1988, and consecrated on 16 October 1988. Jurić retired on 21 June 2000.

See also
 Archdiocese of Split-Makarska

References

External links
Catholic-Hierarchy
Archdiocese of Split-Makarska (Croatian)

1922 births
2012 deaths
20th-century Roman Catholic archbishops in Croatia
Archbishops of Split